The Swan Valley Stampeders are a Junior "A" ice hockey team from Swan River, Manitoba, Canada.  The team plays in the Manitoba Junior Hockey League, a part of the Canadian Junior Hockey League and Hockey Canada.

The team was founded in 1999 and plays its home games at the Swan River Centennial Arena.

Season-by-season record
Note: GP = Games Played, W = Wins, L = Losses, T = Ties, OTL = Overtime Losses, GF = Goals for, GA = Goals against

Playoffs
2000 Lost Quarter-final
OCN Blizzard defeated Swan Valley Stampeders
2001 Lost Quarter-final
OCN Blizzard defeated Swan Valley Stampeders 4-games-to-1
2002 Lost Quarter-final
OCN Blizzard defeated Swan Valley Stampeders 4-games-to-none
2003 Lost Quarter-final
Portage Terriers defeated Swan Valley Stampeders 4-games-to-3
2004 Lost Semi-final
Swan Valley Stampeders defeated Neepawa Natives 4-games-to-2
Portage Terriers defeated Swan Valley Stampeders 4-games-to-2
2005 DNQ
2006 Lost Quarter-final
OCN Blizzard defeated Swan Valley Stampeders 4-games-to-1
2007 DNQ
2008 Lost Quarter-final
Portage Terriers defeated Swan Valley Stampeders 4-games-to-3
2009 DNQ
2010 Lost Semi-final
Swan Valley Stampeders defeated Portage Terriers 4-games-to-1
Dauphin Kings defeated Swan Valley Stampeders 4-games-to-1
2011 Lost Quarter-final
Portage Terriers defeated Swan Valley Stampeders 4-games-to-2
2012 Lost Quarter-final
OCN Blizzard defeated Swan Valley Stampeders 4-games-to-1
2013 Lost Quarter-final
OCN Blizzard defeated Swan Valley Stampeders 4-games-to-1
2014 Lost Quarter-final
Virden Oil Capitals defeated Swan Valley Stampeders 4-games-to-1
2015 Lost Quarter-final
Swan Valley Stampeders defeated Dauphin Kings 2-games-to-0
Winnipeg Blues defeated Swan Valley Stampeders 4-games-to-0
2016 Lost Quarter-final
Swan Valley Stampeders defeated Waywayseecappo Wolverines 2-games-to-0
Steinbach Pistons defeated Swan Valley Stampeders 4-games-to-0
2017 DNQ
2018 Lost Quarter-final
Steinbach Pistons defeated Swan Valley Stampeders 4-games-to-0
2019 Lost Final
Swan Valley Stampeders defeated Dauphin Kings 4-games-to-0
Swan Valley Stampeders defeated Steinbach Pistons 4-games-to-2
Portage Terriers defeated Swan Valley Stampeders 4-games-to-3
2020 Playoffs cancelled
Swan Valley Stampeders leading Waywayseecappo Wolverines 2-games-to-1 when playoffs were cancelled due to COVID-19 pandemic2021 Playoffs cancelled2022 Lost Quarter-finalDauphin Kings defeated Swan Valley Stampeders 4-games-to-2''

See also
List of ice hockey teams in Manitoba
Manitoba Junior Hockey League
Hockey Manitoba

References

External links
Swan Valley Stampeders' Official Website

Manitoba Junior Hockey League teams